The term "Terre Matildiche" is used to refer to the group of territories that was ruled by the countess Matilda of Tuscany.

Territories
 Canossa (cultural capital)
 Reggio Emilia
 Province of Parma
 Province of Modena
 Province of Ferrara
 Tuscany (but not the Tuscan Archipelago)
 parts of Lombardy (Lake Iseo and Adda)
 west Umbria
 Maremma laziale

References

External links

Geographical, historical and cultural regions of Italy
Matilda of Tuscany